
The V8 Zagato model Aston Martin was a grand tourer of the 1980s. Just 52 examples of the coupé and 37 of the convertible were built between 1986 and 1990. The coupé was first unveiled at the 1986 Geneva Motor Show, and orders were quickly taken despite only showing the drawing of the car.

The decision to build the later convertible was controversial – all 52 coupés had already been purchased at the height of the supercar speculation market and owners felt that producing additional cars would lower the value of the coupés. The convertibles consistently fetch higher prices than the roofed versions.

As the name suggests, the V8 Zagato was based on the Aston Martin V8 but with a body by the coachbuilder Zagato.

The design was an angular modern interpretation of the Aston Martin DB4 GT Zagato of the 1960s. The squared off grille was especially controversial. The Zagato was powered by a  V8 engine with twin choke Weber carburettors. The all-alloy car could reach .

It was a luxurious car with a price tag of $156,600 at the time, but with the high rarity, and being released at the supercar price boom of 1987 to 1990, and by the end of the decade, the car was changing hands for £450,000. The later convertible sold for $171,000.

The comedian Rowan Atkinson purchased the first right-hand-drive car produced in 1998 and had it converted to Aston Martin Owners' Club racing series C2 specifications. He crashed it in July 2001 whilst competing at an enthusiasts' meeting, but walked away unhurt. The conversion was undertaken by Aston Martin Works Service with a total rebuild cost of around £220,000. The Tadek Marek 5.3 V8 engine was reworked to produce an estimated , carrying the unique designation 580XR. The car retired from racing in 2007 and Atkinson sold it in 2008 for £122,500.

References

V8 Zagato
Cars introduced in 1986
Cars discontinued in 1990